Ibtissam Jraïdi (born 9 December 1992) is a Moroccan footballer who plays as a forward for ASFAR and the Morocco women's national team.

International career
Jraïdi capped for Morocco at senior level during the 2018 Africa Women Cup of Nations qualification (first round).

Honours 
 AS FAR
 Moroccan Women's Championship (9): 2013, 2014, 2016, 2017, 2018, 2019, 2020, 2021, 2022

 Moroccan Women Throne Cup (8): 2013, 2014, 2015, 2016, 2017, 2018, 2019, 2020

 Morocco-United Arab Emirates Friendship Cup (1): 2016

CAF Women's Champions League Third place: 2021

 IFFHS Africa Team of The Year: 2022

See also
List of Morocco women's international footballers

References

1992 births
Living people
Moroccan women's footballers
Women's association football forwards
Morocco women's international footballers
Saudi Women's Premier League players